Silicon Laboratories, Inc. (Silicon Labs) is a fabless global technology company that designs and manufactures semiconductors, other silicon devices and software, which it sells to electronics design engineers and manufacturers in Internet of Things (IoT) infrastructure worldwide.

It is headquartered in Austin, Texas, United States. The company focuses on microcontrollers (MCUs) and wireless system on chips (SoCs) and modules. The company also produces software stacks including firmware libraries and protocol-based software, and a free software development platform called Simplicity Studio.

Silicon Labs was founded in 1996 and released its first product, an updated DAA design that enabled manufacturers to reduce the size and cost of a modem, two years later. During its first three years, the company focused on RF and CMOS integration, and developed the world's first CMOS RF synthesizer for mobile phones which was released in 1999. Following the appointment of Tyson Tuttle as the CEO in 2012, Silicon Labs has increasingly focused on developing technologies for the IoT market, which in 2019 accounted for more than 50 percent of the company's revenue, but in 2020 had increased to about 58 percent.

In August 2019, Silicon Labs had more than 1,770 patents worldwide issued or pending.

Company history
Silicon Labs was founded by Crystal Semiconductor (now owned by Cirrus Logic Inc.) alumni Nav Sooch, Dave Welland and Jeff Scott in 1996. It became a publicly traded company in 2000. The first product, an updated DAA design, was released in the market in 1998. It cost significantly less than traditional DAAs and used less space compared to established products, which made it an instant success, taking the company's sales from $5.6 million in 1998 to nearly $47 million in 1999.

During its early years, the company focused on developing an improved RF synthesizer for mobile phones that would cost less and take up less space. It introduced its first RF Chip in late 1999.

Since 2012, Silicon Labs has been increasingly focused on developing technologies for the evolving IoT market. On April 22, 2021, Silicon Labs announced the sale of its infrastructure and automotive business to Skyworks Solutions Inc for $2.75 billion. The deal was closed on July 26, 2021.

In July 2021, it was announced that Tyson Tuttle would be stepping down as CEO. In January 2022 former president, Matt Johnson, completed the transition into the CEO position.

Key product launches 
 In 1998, released updated DAA design.
 In 1999, launched RF Chip.
 In 2001, released first products in its timing portfolio, a family of clock generators designed for high-speed communication systems.
 In 2003, entered the mixed-signal MCU market with analog-intensive high-speed 8-bit MCUs.
 In 2004, released its first crystal oscillator family featuring patented digital signal processing phase locked loop (DSPLL) technology.
 In 2005, introduced a single-chip FM receiver, which enabled FM radio to be installed in a new range of applications.
 In 2006, entered the automotive electronics market with the launch of an integrated MCU family.
 In 2007, launched industry's first single-port PoE interface with integrated DC-DC controller.
 In 2008, released industry's smallest fully integrated automotive AM/FM radio receiver IC.
 In 2009, entered the human interface market with a portfolio of fast-response touch, proximity and ambient light sensor devices.
 In 2010, introduced industry's first single-chip multimedia digital TV demodulator.
 In 2011, released industry's first single-chip hybrid TV receiver.
 In 2012, entered the ARM-based 32-bit MCU market with a line of mixed-signal MCUs with USB and non-USB options.
 In 2013, introduced the world's first single-chip digital radio receivers for consumer electronics.
 In 2014, released the world's first digital ultraviolet index sensors.
 In 2015, launched Thread networking technology for connecting devices including wireless sensor networks, thermostats, connected lighting devices and control panels.
 In 2016, released Gecko family of multiprotocol wireless SoC devices.
 In 2017, launched industry's first wireless clocks that support 4G/LTE and Ethernet.
 In 2018, launched Z-Wave 700 hardware/software IoT platform.
 In 2019, launched updated version of wireless Gecko web development platform.
In 2021, launched Wi-SUN® technology
In 2021, announced that Silicon Labs wireless devices support Matter end products

Leadership 
Matt Johnson, Chief Executive Officer
 John Hollister, Chief Financial Officer
Daniel Cooley, Chief Technology Officer
Karuna Annavajjala, Chief Information Officer
 Serena Townsend, Senior Vice President and Chief People Officer
 Megan Lueders, Chief Marketing Officer
 Brandon Tolany, Senior Vice President of Worldwide Sales and Marketing
 Sandeep Kumar, Senior Vice President of Worldwide Operations
 Sharon Hagi, Chief Security Officer
 Néstor Ho, Chief Legal Officer, Vice President and Corporate Secretary

Products 
Silicon Labs provides semiconductor products for use in a variety of connected devices. The company also provides development kits and software including Simplicity Studio, an integrated development environment for IoT connected device applications.

'Silicon Labs' portfolio is built around the Internet of Things (IoT) focus area, primarily focused on home and life and industrial and commercial wireless applications.

Internet of Things 
 Wireless:
 System-on-Chip
 Mesh Networking Modules
 Protocols supported include:
 Bluetooth
 Proprietary wireless protocols for Sub-GHz and 2.4 GHz frequencies
 Zigbee
 Z-Wave for smart home applications
 Thread networking solutions
 Wi-Fi transceivers, transceiver modules, Xpress modules, stand-alone modules
Wi-SUN®
 MCUs
 EFM8 8-bit MCUs
 EFM32 32-bit MCUs
 Sensors

Security technologies 
Silicon Labs’ product portfolio is protected by a range of security measures:

Anti-rollback prevention
 Protects device by preventing the execution of previous versions of authenticated firmware that might carry security flaws

Cryptographic accelerator

Differential Power Analysis (DPA) countermeasures

Protected secret key storage

Public Key Infrastructure
 IoT Device Certificate Authority enabling device-to-device or device-to-server identity authentication

Secure boot
 Secure Boot with Root of Trust and Secure Loader (RTSL) provides additional security for loading initial code to the system microcontroller

Secure debug with lock/unlock
 Access to debug port controlled by a unique lock token generated by signing a revocable unique identifier with a customer generated private key

Secure link
 Encrypting the link between a host processor and radio transceiver or network co-processor (NCP)

Secure programming at manufacturing

Secure Vault
 Integrated hardware and software security technology Features include:
 Secure device identity
 Secure key management and storage
 Advanced tamper detection

True Random Number Generator

Protocols 
Silicon Labs technologies support seven wireless protocols.

Bluetooth 

Bluetooth software enables developers to utilize Bluetooth LE, Bluetooth 5, Bluetooth 5.1, Bluetooth 5.2, and Bluetooth mesh. Bluetooth SDK can be used to create standalone Bluetooth applications for Wireless Gecko SoCs or modules, or network co-processor (NCP) applications. Products include:

 Bluetooth SoCs
 Certified Bluetooth modules
 Software

Proprietary wireless protocols

Devices cover sub-GHz and 2.4 GHz frequencies, delivering ultra-low power, long range, up to 20dBm output power and different modulation schemes for major frequency bands. Products include:

 Transceivers
 Multi-band wireless SoCs for IoT applications 
 Wireless MCPs
 RF synthesizers
 Dynamic Multi-protocol (DMP) for smartphone connectivity in long-range solutions
 SDKs for accelerating proprietary protocol development

Thread

Technologies that enabling IP connectivity through self-healing mesh features, native IPv6 based connectivity and different security options. Products include:

 Software stacks
 Development tools
 Modules
 SoCs
 Reference designs

Zigbee 

Software stacks and development tools for Zigbee applications, including Mesh Networking SoCs and modules.

Z-Wave 

Modules and SoCs for applications in sectors including smart home, hospitality and MDUs, where sensors and battery-operated devices require long range and low power.

Wi-Fi 

Wi-Fi SoCs and modules designed for applications requiring low power and good RF performance, such as IoT. Products include:

 Wi-Fi transceivers
 Transceiver modules
 Xpress modules
 Stand-alone modules
Wi-SUN®

Wi-SUN (Wireless Smart Ubiquitous Network) is a field area network (FAN) to enable long-distance connectivity (https://www.allaboutcircuits.com/news/wisun-new-wireless-standard-rivaling-lorawan-nb-iot-smart-cities/). The Wi-SUN technology aims to simplify LPWAN deployment and enable secure wireless connectivity in applications including advanced metering infrastructure (AMI), street lighting networks, asset management, and parking, air quality, and waste management sensors.

Matter

Matter is a global IoT connectivity standard that builds on top of existing IP-connectivity protocols to enable cross-platform IoT communication, encompassing end products, mobile applications, and cloud services. Silicon Labs wireless devices are available for the development of Matter end products that support Thread, Wi-Fi, and Bluetooth protocols.

Industry associations 
Silicon Labs is a founding member of both the ZigBee Alliance and the Thread Group, and is on the Board of Directors at the Wi-SUN Alliance.

The company is also a member of the Bluetooth Special Interest Group, Wi-Fi Alliance, Z-Wave Alliance and a Gold member of the Open Connectivity Foundation and the RISC-V Foundation.

Acquisitions 
 Krypton Isolation Inc. (2000)
 Cygnal Integrated Products (2003)
 Silicon Magike (2005)
 Silembia (2006)
 Integration Associates (2008)
 Silicon Clocks and ChipSensors (2010)
 SpectraLinear (2011)
 Ember Corporation (2012)
 Energy Micro (2013)
 Touchstone Semiconductor (2014)
 Bluegiga and Telegesis(2015)
 Micrium (2016)
 Zentri (2017)
 Z-Wave, acquired from Sigma Designs (2018)
 IEEE 1588 precision time protocol (PTP) software and module assets from Qulsar (2019)
 Redpine Signals’ connectivity business (2020)

Finances 
For the fiscal year 2020, Silicon Labs reported GAAP earnings of $12.5 million with an annual revenue of $886 million. Its market capitalization was valued at $6.02 billion in February 2021.

Locations 
Silicon Labs is headquartered in Austin, Texas, with regional offices in Boston, Massachusetts and San Jose, California. The company has also corporate offices in Montreal, Canada; Copenhagen, Denmark; Espoo, Finland; Budapest, Hungary; Oslo, Norway and Singapore.

It has 15 sales offices across the world. These include Boston and San Jose in the US; Beijing, Shanghai, Shenzhen and Wuhan in China; Espoo, Finland; Montigny-le-Bretonneux, France; Munich, Germany; Milan, Italy; Tokyo, Japan; Seoul, South Korea; Singapore; Taipei, Taiwan; and Camberley, the UK.

Silicon Labs has a wireless development center in Hyderabad, India.

References 

Fabless semiconductor companies
Semiconductor companies of the United States
Electronics companies established in 1996
American companies established in 1996
Manufacturing companies based in Austin, Texas
Companies listed on the Nasdaq